Pinetown Girls' High School is a public school for girls in Josiah Gumede road (i.e. Old Main Road), Pinetown, KwaZulu-Natal, South Africa. It was founded in 1955 as Pinetown High School, a co-educational school, at its current site. On January 1, 1978, the boys were split off into Pinetown Boys' High School. The school changed its name to Pinetown Girls' High School, but kept the original school badge and school motto, Fortiter in Omne, which is Latin, and means Bravely Into All Things. The boys' and girls' school are located in close proximity to each other. The two schools also host drama shows annually together, as a joint event.

Badge 
The badge includes the letters PHS (Pinetown High School), which are also used by its brother school, Pinetown Boys' High School, a crown which represents the period when South Africa was part of the British Empire, three pine cones honouring Sir Benjamin Pine, who was instrumental in developing Pinetown when it was still a village, and a book which stands for education.

Notable alumnae 
 Pearl Thusi, actress, model, television host, and radio personality
 Zanda Zakuza, singer

External links 
 Pinetown Girls’ High School website

Schools in KwaZulu-Natal
Girls' schools in South Africa
Educational institutions established in 1955
1955 establishments in South Africa